Raymond Stuart Kelvin CBE (born on 11 December 1955 in north London) is the founder and former chief executive of the retail clothing retail company Ted Baker. He started working in his uncle's menswear shop in Enfield at the age of eleven and founded the Ted Baker brand in 1988 when he opened a shop specialising in men's shirts in Glasgow.

Early life and education
Kelvin, who is Jewish, grew up in Edmonton, north London, and was educated at JFS.

Awards
Kelvin was awarded an honorary doctorate in business administration from the University of Bath in 2007. In the 2011 New Year Honours, he was appointed Commander of the Order of the British Empire (CBE) for services to the fashion industry.

Personal life
Kelvin was married for six years to actress Georgia Slowe before splitting up in 1999 and divorcing in 2000. They have two sons. In March 2012, Kelvin married his second wife, Clare, with whom he has a daughter.

In his spare time he enjoys fly-fishing.

He is a Conservative Party donor.

Harassment allegations 
A former employee created a petition in 2018 that received 2,000 signatures to put an end to his hugs and allegedly inappropriate activities with staff, as a result of an unconfirmed lack of support from Ted Baker's HR department. On 7 December 2018 it was announced that Kelvin would be taking voluntary leave of absence from the company. On 4 March 2019, following an internal independent committee investigation, it was announced that Kelvin had resigned and would be leaving Ted Baker with immediate effect.

References

1955 births
Living people
20th-century English businesspeople
20th-century Jews
21st-century British Jews
21st-century English businesspeople
British retail company founders
Businesspeople from London
Commanders of the Order of the British Empire
Conservative Party (UK) donors
English businesspeople in fashion
English businesspeople in retailing
English chief executives
English Jews
People educated at JFS (school)
Clothing retailers of the United Kingdom
People associated with the University of Bath
People from Edmonton, London
Retail company founders